Bob Chisholm (born 14 November 1940) is a former  Australian rules footballer who played with South Melbourne in the Victorian Football League (VFL).

Notes

External links 

Living people
1940 births
Australian rules footballers from New South Wales
Sydney Swans players